Pseudomonas psychrophila is a psychrophilic, Gram-negative, aerobic, straight rod bacterium with polar flagella. The type strain is JCM 10889.

References

External links
Type strain of Pseudomonas psychrophila at BacDive -  the Bacterial Diversity Metadatabase

Pseudomonadales
Bacteria described in 2001